The Tamil Nadu Dr. M.G.R. Medical University ( TNMGRMU) is a government medical university situated in Guindy in the southern part of the city of Chennai, Tamil Nadu, India. It is one of the premier medical universities in India, named after the former Chief Minister of Tamil Nadu M. G. Ramachandran (M.G.R.) and it is the second largest health sciences university in India after Rajiv Gandhi University of Health Sciences, Karnataka.

History

The members of the High Level Committee, consisting of Dr. S. Arumugam, Dr. M. Natarajan, and Dr. S. Kameswaran, submitted the proposals to the former Chief Minister of Tamil Nadu M. G. Ramachandran in the presence of H. V. Hande, former Minister for Health and Family Welfare Department of Tamil Nadu, on 5 July 1983 to start a separate medical university in Tamil Nadu.

The Tamil Nadu Medical University Act, 1987 received the assent of the former President of the Republic of India R. Venkataraman on 24 September 1987. This affiliated university started functioning in July 1988 and is governed by the said act. By 1991, it was named after the former Chief Minister of Tamil Nadu M. G. Ramachandran (M.G.R.) through The Tamil Nadu Dr. M.G.R. Medical University, Chennai Act, 1987.

The Tamil Nadu Dr. M.G.R. Medical University is the only medical university in Tamil Nadu capable of granting affiliation to new medical and paramedical colleges, government- or self-financed, and awarding degrees (also note that until 1988, all degrees in health sciences in Tamil Nadu were awarded by the University of Madras).

Administration
The Chancellor and Pro-Chancellor of the university are the Governor and the Minister of Health and Family Welfare of Tamil Nadu, respectively. The Vice-Chancellor is the main academic officer and administrator in the everyday functioning of the university and is appointed by the Government of Tamil Nadu.

Future
The university is planning to set up a 500-bed hospital on four acres of land on the outskirts of the Raj Bhavan campus, with 300 beds set to be installed in the first year.

Vice-chancellors

Affiliated private medical colleges

Government Medical Colleges (Allopathy)

Government Medical Colleges (Dental)

Government Medical Colleges (AYUSH)

Category B Government Aided Medical Colleges

See also 
 Rajiv Gandhi University of Health Sciences

References

External links

Medical and health sciences universities in India
Medical colleges in Tamil Nadu
Universities in Chennai
Memorials to M G Ramachandran
1987 establishments in Tamil Nadu
Educational institutions established in 1987